"Let It Rock" is a song written and recorded by rock and roll pioneer Chuck Berry. Chess Records released it as single, which reached number 64 on the U.S. Billboard Hot 100 chart in February 1960.  Chess later added it to Berry's album Rockin' at the Hops (1960). In 1963, Pye Records released it as a single in the UK, where it reached number six.

"Let It Rock" was recorded by Berry on guitar and vocal, with long-time backing musicians Johnnie Johnson on piano, Willie Dixon on double bass, and Fred Below on drums.

In a song review for AllMusic, critic Matthew Greenwald called it a "rock & roll masterpiece... Utilizing the same geographic images as 'Roll Over Beethoven' and 'Johnny B Goode,' (among others), Chuck Berry creates an atmosphere that is definitive rock & roll poetry".

Renditions
A live version of "Let It Rock" was recorded by the Rolling Stones during a performance in Leeds, England, in 1971. Described by critic Stephen Thomas Erlewine as "cooking" and "fiery", the song was included as the B-side of "Brown Sugar" in the UK in 1971 and later on the compilations Rarities 1971–2003 (2005) and The Singles 1971–2006 (2011). "Let It Rock" also opens the concert video The Rolling Stones: Some Girls Live in Texas '78 (2011).

In December 1975, a live version of "Let It Rock" was recorded by Australian band Skyhooks during a performance in Melbourne. Released as a single with live versions of "Revolution" and "Saturday Night" as the B-side, the song peaked at number 26 in Australia.

References

1960 songs
1960 singles
1976 singles
Skyhooks (band) songs
Chess Records singles
Mushroom Records singles
Chuck Berry songs
Songs written by Chuck Berry
The Rolling Stones songs